Nazik may refer to:

Given name
 Nazik al-Abid (1887–1959), Syrian activist
 Nazik Avdalyan Armenian international weightlifter, 2007 European Weightlifting Championships and others
 Nazik Cynthia Cozette (Cynthia Cozette Lee) (born 1953), American classical music composer
 Nazik Hariri, widow of former Lebanese Prime Minister Rafik Hariri
 Nazik Al-Malaika (1923–2007), Iraqi poet
 Nazik Saba Yared (born 1928), Lebanese novelist, and academic

Places
 Lake Nazik, freshwater lake in the Bitlis Province, eastern part of Turkey
 Nazik, Iran (disambiguation), places in Iran